Loyalty and Righteousness, also known as Shogun Saints, is a 1972 Hong Kong action martial arts film directed by Lung Chien,  and starring Jimmy Wang Yu.

Plot 

Warlord Yu Ming gained great power for himself. He was a killer, and betrayed his friend General Yip and then slaughtered his family. But the General's son escaped, and spent all the life learning martial arts, with only will to killYu Ming.

Cast

 Jimmy Wang Yu, as Yu Wang)
 Pin Chiang 	
 Chia-Lin Sun	
 Yeh Tien	
 Shao-Chun Chang	
 Hui-Lou Chen	
 Li-Yun Chen	
 Tao Chiang
 Wan-Hsi Chin

References

External links

1970 films
1970 martial arts films
1970s action films
1970s martial arts films
1970s Cantonese-language films
Films set in Shanghai
Films shot in Hong Kong
Hong Kong action films
Hong Kong films about revenge
Hong Kong martial arts films
Kung fu films
1970s Mandarin-language films
Films directed by Lung Chien
1970s Hong Kong films